Gmina Gzy is a rural gmina (administrative district) in Pułtusk County, Masovian Voivodeship, in east-central Poland. Its seat is the village of Gzy, which lies approximately 10 kilometres (6 mi) north-west of Pułtusk and 56 km (35 mi) north of Warsaw.

Gmina Gzy contains the villages and settlements of Begno, Borza-Przechy, Borza-Strumiany, Dębiny, Gotardy, Grochy-Imbrzyki, Grochy-Krupy, Grochy-Serwatki, Gzy, Gzy-Wisnowa, Kałęczyn, Kęsy-Pańki, Ostaszewo-Włuski, Pękowo, Porzowo, Przewodowo Poduchowne, Przewodowo-Majorat, Przewodowo-Parcele, Sisice, Skaszewo Włościańskie, Słończewo, Stare Grochy, Sulnikowo, Szyszki Włościańskie, Szyszki-Folwark, Tąsewy, Wójty-Trojany, Wysocki, Zalesie-Grzymały, Zalesie-Lenki, Zalesie-Pacuszki, Żebry-Falbogi, Żebry-Wiatraki, Żebry-Włosty and Żeromin Drugi.

Neighbouring gminas
Gmina Gzy is bordered by the gminas of Gołymin-Ośrodek, Karniewo, Pułtusk, Sońsk, Świercze and Winnica.

References

External links
Polish official population figures 2006

Gzy
Pułtusk County